Diploderma varcoae, the Chinese japalure, is endemic to China.

References

Diploderma
Reptiles of China
Reptiles described in 1918
Taxa named by George Albert Boulenger